Breadsticks, also known as grissini, grissino or dipping sticks, (ghërsin in ) are generally pencil-sized sticks of crisp, dry baked bread that originated in Piedmont, a region of Italy. There is also a soft-baked breadstick version popular in North America.

History 
It's believed that it originated in 1643, when a Florentine abbot described a long-shaped and "bone-thin" bread being made in Lanzo Torinese, a town outside of Turin. Tradition states, however, that it originated in the region of Piedmont in the 17th century, invented by a baker called Antonio Brunero, from Turin. It was a food that was intended to be easier to digest for the Duke Victor Amadeus II of Savoy, who had digestive problems in his childhood.

Serving 
In Italian-American restaurants, breadsticks may be offered as an appetizer. In some instances or regions, they may be a type that is larger than pencil-sized, as well as soft instead of hard. They may also be combined with ingredients such as prosciutto as an hors d'œuvre. 

In many North American restaurants, breadsticks are soft, frequently topped with butter, garlic, and cheese when served as appetizers; as a dessert item, they can be topped with cinnamon, sugar, and icing.

Pre-made, dried breadsticks can be found being sold in markets as a quick snack or a pre-meal appetizer for home use, somewhat similar to a cracker. Usually served with a dip of some sort, such as cheese.

Another recipe for breadsticks, called rosquilletas, exists in Comunitat Valenciana.

See also
Baguette, the larger, long loaf of bread from France
Pretzel sticks

References

Italian breads
Italian-American cuisine
Greek-American cuisine
Spanish-American cuisine
Valencian cuisine
Lanzo Torinese